Milorad Bajović (born 2 February 1964) is a Montenegrin football manager and former player.

Club career
After playing for his hometown club Sutjeska Nikšić in the Yugoslav Second League, Bajović moved to Yugoslav First League side Partizan in the summer of 1985. He later played for Budućnost Titograd, OFK Beograd, Mogren, Vitória Setúbal (Portugal), Pelita Jaya (Indonesia), and Vrbas.

International career
At international level, Bajović represented Yugoslavia at under-21 level, earning one cap in September 1984.

Managerial career
After hanging up his boots, Bajović served as an assistant manager to Miodrag Božović at numerous clubs, including Rostov, Lokomotiv Moscow, and Krylia Sovetov.

Personal life
Bajović is the younger brother of fellow footballer Miodrag Bajović.

References

External links
 
 

1964 births
Living people
Footballers from Nikšić
Yugoslav footballers
Serbia and Montenegro footballers
Montenegrin footballers
Association football midfielders
Yugoslavia under-21 international footballers
FK Sutjeska Nikšić players
FK Partizan players
FK Budućnost Podgorica players
OFK Beograd players
FK Mogren players
Vitória F.C. players
FK Vrbas players
Yugoslav Second League players
Yugoslav First League players
Liga Portugal 2 players
Second League of Serbia and Montenegro players
Yugoslav expatriate footballers
Serbia and Montenegro expatriate footballers
Expatriate footballers in Portugal
Expatriate footballers in Indonesia
Serbia and Montenegro expatriate sportspeople in Indonesia
Montenegrin football managers
Montenegrin expatriate football managers
Expatriate football managers in Russia
Montenegrin expatriate sportspeople in Russia
Montenegrin expatriate sportspeople in Portugal